The word Shantia means holy. 
in persian language means victor(pirouz).
It comes from the root "Sant" in Latin which was adopted by Hebrew and pronounced as "Shant". Afterwards, Iranian people used it to refer to Imam Ali, the Imam of Muslims, by saying "Shantia" instead. This word has been used in Persian poems for describing Imam Ali, and today is used as a boy's name or as a surname in this language.

References

Persian feminine given names